Yury Dubinin may refer to:

 Yuri Dubinin (1930 – 2013), Soviet diplomat and ambassador to the United States from 1986 to 1990
 Yury Dubinin (wrestler) (born 1976), Olympic wrestler from Belarus
 Yury Dubinin (speedway rider), Soviet Union speedway rider